Infanta Isabel Luísa of Portugal (6 January 1669 – 21 October 1690) was a Portuguese infanta and the sole daughter of Peter II of Portugal and his first wife and former sister-in-law Maria Francisca of Savoy. She was the heir presumptive to the throne of Portugal between 1668 and 1689, when her half-brother John was born. As such, she was styled Princess of Beira.

Biography

Isabel Luísa was the only child of Peter II of Portugal and his first wife, the French born Princess Marie Françoise of Savoy. She was born at the Ribeira Palace, Lisbon, in 1669.

Marriage prospects

It was planned that she would marry Victor Amadeus II of Savoy, a first cousin through her aunt Marie Jeanne, Duchess of Savoy, then regent for her son. The marriage was opposed by most of the Savoyard court as it meant that Victor Amadeus would live in Portugal and his mother would remain in power. But that plan was not implemented.

Other proposed candidates included Gian Gastone de' Medici (future Grand Duke of Tuscany), le Grand Dauphin son of Louis XIV, Charles II of Spain, the Duke of Parma as well as a Count Palatine of Neuburg. Nothing came of these plans. For this she was nicknamed Sempre-noiva, "Always-engaged".

Death and burial
She died of smallpox at Palhavã in 1690, when she was 21 years old. Isabel Luísa is buried at the Monastery of São Vicente de Fora in Lisbon after being moved from the Convent of the Francesinhas.

Ancestry

References

Princesses of Beira
Portuguese royalty
People from Lisbon
1668 births
1690 deaths
17th-century Portuguese people
17th-century Portuguese women
Burials at the Monastery of São Vicente de Fora
House of Braganza
Deaths from smallpox
Daughters of kings